The Violin Ensemble of Novosibirsk State Technical University is the official musical ensemble of violinists at the NSTU, located in Novosibirsk, Russia. It is currently under the direction of Mikhail Blam.

History
In the 1960s, a chamber orchestra existed at the Novosibirsk Electrotechnical Institute, led by Yulian Notanovich Faktorovich. The first rehearsals took place in February 1970 and by 20 April the ensemble gave its first public performance. The first members were the students of the Technical University, who finished at a 7-year music school. Later many teachers of music schools, students of different Novosibirsk Institutes, doctors, engineers and scientists joined the Ensemble. In 1975, the ensemble participated in a festival in Lviv, Ukraine, and since 1979, it has the title "People's" and gives annual concert in Novosibirsk Conservatory. In 1985 the ensemble went to Yerevan, Armenia, and was awarded the first prize at the Festival of Classic Music. The greatest success came in 1990 when at the first All-union Festival of Chamber and Symphony Orchestras the Ensemble was awarded the first prize. In 1990 the ensemble was invited to Germany to take part in the International Festival "Eurotreff" and had a great success that was followed by numerous publications in media. In 1993 the Ensemble took a trip to Thessaloniki, Greece, where gave a performance in final concert of the International Fair. The repertoire includes Bach and Vivaldi concerts, works by Brahms, Strauss, Kreisler, Dvorzak, Tchaikovsky, Rachmaninov, Shostakovich, Sviridov, Shedrin, Khachaturyan, all together more than 80. All of them are learned by heart that contributes to unity and artistic expression.

References

Musical groups from Novosibirsk
Novosibirsk State Technical University
Violin organizations
String orchestras
Soviet performing ensembles